Ilan Rubin (born July 7, 1988) is an American musician, singer, and songwriter. He is known primarily for playing drums with bands such as Nine Inch Nails, Paramore, and Angels & Airwaves. In 2008 he formed The New Regime, in which he sings and plays all instruments in the studio and plays guitar with a band for live performances. In 2021 Ilan released music for the first time under his name. His debut single "Talk Talk Talk" was remixed by Phantogram.

As a member of Nine Inch Nails, in 2020 Rubin was inducted into the Rock and Roll Hall of Fame as the youngest living inductee in its history. He is also the first Rock Hall inductee to be born in the 1980s.

Early life
Rubin was raised in San Diego, California. He began playing drums at the age of eight, when he discovered his father's 1968 Silver Sparkle Ludwig drum kit set up in the garage. After three months of "toying" with the kit, he had taught himself to play and was jamming with his older brothers. By age nine, he was ready to play for F.o.N., a band that eventually would do three stints on the Vans Warped Tour, where Rubin would also fill in on drums for bands such as NOFX. In 1999, F.o.N. opened Woodstock '99 on the Emerging Artist Stage; as a result, 11-year-old Rubin gained entry into the Guinness Book of World Records as the youngest musician to ever play on a Woodstock stage.

Shortly thereafter, Rubin submitted a video to Modern Drummer Magazine of him doing a solo during an F.o.N. performance, which was picked by the magazine as the winning entry in its "Best Undiscovered Drummer Under the Age of 18" contest. The winner of the 18-and-over category came from Argentina, and both drummers were invited to perform at the 2000 Modern Drummer Festival, by which time Rubin had turned 12. He has taken lessons from Blink-182's drummer Travis Barker and The Hooters' drummer David Uosikkinen.

Career

Early career
Immediately prior to working with Lostprophets, Rubin was the drummer for the band Denver Harbor, which included his older brother, Aaron, as bassist, who had played guitar in F.o.N., as well as 2 ex-members of the punk band Fenix TX. Denver Harbor was dropped from their label one year after their only full-length album, Scenic, was released in 2004 but not before the band did a few round-trip tours of the United States and one week in Japan with a re-united Fenix TX.

Lostprophets (2006–2008)

Rubin was the drummer for the Welsh band Lostprophets. He replaced Mike Chiplin, founding member and original drummer, who left the band in 2005 to pursue other musical opportunities. Before finding Rubin, Lostprophets hired session drummer Josh Freese to record the tracks on Liberation Transmission. Then, after Rubin joined, he played the remaining two tracks on Liberation Transmission: "For All These Times Son, For All These Times" and "Everybody's Screaming!!!". The drummer on the demos for this period are unclear with all tracks, depending on the time the demos were made, potentially being recorded by either former drummer Mike Chiplin, frontman Ian Watkins (who occasionally played drums in demos) or Rubin. Either Rubin or Freese may have recorded the B-Side, "Every Song", which comes from the album sessions. Rubin, however, toured from 2006 to 2008 with the band and appeared in the videos for "Rooftops (A Liberation Broadcast)", "A Town Called Hypocrisy", "Can't Catch Tomorrow (Good Shoes Won't Save You This Time)" and "4:AM Forever".  He left the band in late 2008 but not before he tracked all of the drums and helped pen some of the music on the band's fourth studio release The Betrayed.

The New Regime (2007–2020)
Rubin's first solo album, under the pseudonym 'The New Regime', called Coup, was recorded throughout 2007 and 2008 and released in November 2008. While touring with Nine Inch Nails and following the conclusion of the Wave Goodbye Tour Rubin worked on his second album, Speak Through The White Noise, which was released in April 2011. Prior to this, Ilan released a free single titled 'Remission Of Guilt' through his website. It has been confirmed that this track will not be on the new album. in 2011 he went on Tour with Taking Back Sunday as an opening act. In 2013 and 2015, he released the two halves of his next project, titled Exhibit A and Exhibit B. On March 6, 2020, The New Regime released its fifth studio album, Heart Mind Body & Soul, featuring the singles "Turning a Blind Eye" and "Heart Mind Body & Soul." Over a five-month period prior to its release, Rubin released three EPs (Heart, Mind, and Body), each with four songs from the upcoming album that fit the themes of the titles. The New Regime was on tour with Silversun Pickups in March 2020

Nine Inch Nails (2009–present)

On November 15, 2008, Trent Reznor announced via the Nine Inch Nails website that Rubin would be joining industrial rock band Nine Inch Nails as their drummer after the departure of Josh Freese in late 2008.  Upon learning of his skills as a multi-instrumentalist, Reznor decided to scale the latest live incarnation of Nine Inch Nails down to a four-piece, where Rubin contributed keyboards and percussion. The new lineup played the final Nine Inch Nails tour dubbed the "Wave Goodbye" tour, starting in Australia and New Zealand, then North America, continuing to Europe and Asia before returning to the U.S. for a final set of dates in smaller venues. During the last show at the Wiltern theatre, Reznor discussed the band's future, including new recordings featuring the current live band.

In February 2013, Reznor announced the return of Nine Inch Nails and revealed tour details. He also revealed that the new lineup of the band included Rubin, Eric Avery of Jane's Addiction, Adrian Belew of King Crimson, and Josh Eustis of Telefon Tel Aviv, as well as returning member Alessandro Cortini.

Angels & Airwaves (2011–present)

In 2011, Rubin joined Angels & Airwaves, replacing drummer Atom Willard. From 2014 to 2018, Rubin was the only other songwriter for the band besides frontman Tom DeLonge, while the status of the other members was left unknown. During that time, he recorded the band's 2014 album, The Dream Walker, and the EPs ...Of Nightmares in 2015 and Chasing Shadows in 2016, respectively. Beyond drumming, Rubin has taken on playing multiple instruments on for the band while recording, and continued to do so on the band's 2021 album, Lifeforms. During this time, DeLonge would go on to credit Rubin as a major contributor to the band's songwriting process.

Paramore (2012–2013)

On June 28, 2012 Paramore confirmed Rubin would drum on their fourth album, via Twitter, Tumblr and Facebook, though he didn't join as an official member of the band. Rubin recorded all the drums on their self-titled album and joined them for its subsequent tour.

Equipment
Rubin is a co-owner of Q Drum Co; from whom he plays a signature custom kit, generally made of metal. He usually plays a simple setup consisting of a 26 inch bass drum, one 13-14 inch rack tom, 16 and 18 inch floor toms, and a 14 inch metal snare drum. His toms are fitted with clear Remo Controlled Sound Dots. His snare normally has a Remo X14, and his kick is fitted with the coated PowerStroke3. He uses clear Ambassadors on the resonant sides of all of his drums. He uses Vater Nude 1A drumsticks, Zildjian cymbals and DW 5000 series pedals and 9000 series stands. In addition to all of this, he will also sometimes incorporate several electronic accessories into his kit. These would include 2 pairs of Roland electronic pads (1 pair on each side of his kit), triggers on his snare and kick which are used to blend electronic samples with acoustic drum sounds, and a Roland KD-7, which is essentially a kick trigger that mounts to a traditional kick pedal. He also frequently records with his father's 1968 Ludwig Sparkle Drumset with a Supraphonic snare drum. His cymbal setup follows:

15" A Avedis Hi-Hats

19" A Avedis Crash Ride

20" A Avedis Crash Ride

24" K Zildjian Light Ride

Prior to joining the companies he is with today, Rubin endorsed OCDP drums and Paiste cymbals.

With the New Regime, his solo project, his  1980 prototype Gibson Les Paul is featured prominently. He has also used the Fender Jaguar thinline, Martin D-16GT and Fender Jaguar Bass, among other guitars. He also uses an assortment of Keyboards, Synthesizers and effects pedals. In the past, he was featured in a promotional video for the Akai Pro Advance 61 keyboard.

The New Regime live line up
 Ilan Rubin: vocals, piano, guitar
 Kemble Walters: bass, vocals
 Rob Ketchum: drums, vocals

Discography
Ilan Rubin
 Talk Talk Talk - Single (2021)
 Talk Talk Talk (Phantogram Remix) - Single (2021)
 Chaos in Motion - Single (2021)
 Good Morning Good Morning (The Beatles cover) - Single (2022)
 24hr. Fix - Single (February 2022)
The New Regime
 "Eleanor Rigby" (The Beatles cover) (2007)
 Coup (2008)
 Remission of Guilt (2010)
 Speak Through The White Noise (2011) 
 Exhibit A (2013)
 Exhibit B (2015)
 Heart Mind Body & Soul (2020)

References

External links 

 
 
 The New Regime Forum
 Coup release announcement
  Nine Inch Nails announcement
 Nine Inch Nails forum post about the announcement (with the original announcement)
 Interview with Ilan Rubin by Drum Channel, Part 1 of 3
 Interview with Ilan Rubin by Drum Channel, Part 2 of 3
 Interview with Ilan Rubin by Drum Channel, Part 3 of 3

1988 births
American heavy metal drummers
Jewish American musicians
Jewish heavy metal musicians
Living people
Lostprophets members
Musicians from San Diego
Nine Inch Nails members
People from Bonita, California
People from Chula Vista, California
People from Los Angeles
21st-century American drummers
Angels & Airwaves members